Pokomo may refer to:
 Pokomo people
 Pokomo language

Language and nationality disambiguation pages